Ragamuffin Hip-Hop is the only album by the ragga/hip hop duo Asher D and Daddy Freddy, released in 1988 on the Music of Life label.

Track listing
"Ragamuffin Hip Hop" - 5:30
"Africa" - 2:55
"Brutality" - 5:10
"Summertime" - 3:00
"Don't Stop, Do It" - 5:55
"Posse Rock & Move (5:45)
"Rough and Rugged (5:45)
"Run Come Follow We (5:00)
"Asher's Revenge (6:10)

Profile Records albums
Daddy Freddy albums
1988 debut albums